Navura is a monotypic snout moth genus. Its one species, Navura lobata, was described by William Schaus in 1913. It is found in Costa Rica and Panama.

References

Moths described in 1913
Chrysauginae
Monotypic moth genera
Moths of Central America
Pyralidae genera